Bucculatrix sagax is a moth in the  family Bucculatricidae. It was described in 1999 by Wolfram Mey and is found in Yemen.

References

Natural History Museum Lepidoptera generic names catalog

Bucculatricidae
Moths described in 1999
Moths of the Arabian Peninsula